Arlington High School is a public high school located in Arlington, Washington and is home to the Eagles.  The enrollment was 1,598 for the 2005–2006 school year. This school was built in 2002 after years of unsuccessful building bonds.  The grand opening, after five years of raising funds, was on May 31, 2003.

Sports
Arlington's rivals are the Stanwood Spartans, who they play annually in football for the Stilly Cup.

In 2010, the Arlington Eagles won the WESCO championship against Jackson High School 42–21. In 2013, the Arlington Eagles won the softball state title.

Activities

The school's Hi-Q team, a trivia-based competition, placed first in its region, and the Knowledge Bowl team placed third in the state. In 2014, the AHS Hi-Q team placed third at State. It has a Performing Arts Center for its almost 200 band members and other performing groups.  The Arlington High School Jazz Choir won first place at Fullerton Jazz Festival in Los Angeles California in 2007, first place at the North Texas University Jazz Festival in 2008, and  second place in the advanced category of the 2009 Fullerton Jazz Festival.

Demographics
As of 2018, the demographic breakdown of Arlington High School ethnicities is:
79% White
11% Hispanic
 2% Asian
 1% American Indian or Alaskan Native
 1% Black

References

External links
 School website

Educational institutions established in 2002
High schools in Snohomish County, Washington
Public high schools in Washington (state)
2002 establishments in Washington (state)
Arlington, Washington